Cyprina ligeriensis is an extinct species of saltwater clam, a fossil marine bivalve mollusc in the family Arcticidae. This species was described by Alcide d'Orbigny in 1843.

References

Bibliography
 

Arcticidae
Prehistoric bivalves
Fossil taxa described in 1843